Dholpur Combined Cycle Power Station is a gas-based thermal power plant located near Dholpur, Rajasthan. The power plant is operated by the Rajasthan Rajya Vidyut Utpadan Nigam Ltd.

The EPC contractor for the project is BGR Energy Systems Ltd.

Capacity
Is has an installed capacity of 330 MW

References

Natural gas-fired power stations in Rajasthan
Dholpur district
2007 establishments in Rajasthan
Energy infrastructure completed in 2007